Luther Russell (born November 30, 1970) is an American musician who has been recording since 1991.  He is the grandson of songwriter Bob Russell and the grandnephew of songwriter Bud Green.

Career

At 17, Russell formed his first band called The Bootheels with Jakob Dylan, son of Bob Dylan, later of the Wallflowers. The Bootheels also included drummer Aaron A. Brooks.

He was lead singer/songwriter of the band, The Freewheelers, who made two albums for DGC and American, respectively.

He then went solo, starting with "Lowdown World" (1997), "Down At Kit's" (1999), and "Spare Change" (2001), all recorded while living in Portland, Oregon. It was also in the great northwest that Russell produced many independent records by such acclaimed artists as Richmond Fontaine and Fernando. Since relocating back to his hometown of Los Angeles in, he released his fourth solo record titled Repair, which was produced by Ethan Johns (Kings of Leon, The Jayhawks, Ryan Adams). Russell and Johns also co-produced the debut album of singer Sarabeth Tucek. He has also worked with The Relationship featuring Brian Bell of Weezer , co-producing their albums and latest single. After producing a string of albums and singles between 2007 and 2010 by artists such as Noah And The Whale, Folks, Horse Stories and many more, Russell released the critically acclaimed double-album, The Invisible Audience (2011). Russell has gone on to form Those Pretty Wrongs with Jody Stephens of Big Star. Their debut 7" was released in 2015 on Burger Records. Their debut LP released May 13, 2016 on the Ardent Music label.

Russell has traveled and performed extensively and shared the stage with acts such as Arthur Lee, Johnny Cash, Tom Petty, Etta James, Los Lobos and Wilco.

Discography

The Freewheelers
The Freewheelers (DGC, 1991),
The Freewheelers Play Bob Russell (Promo LP, 1993),
Waitin' For George (American Recordings, 1996).

Solo
Lowdown World (Highland, 1997)
Down At Kit's (Cravedog, 1999)
Spare Change (In Music We Trust, 2001)
Repair (2007)
"Good Music b/w Sidekick Reverb" (single) 2009
Motorbike EP (2010)
The Invisible Audience (2011)
Medium Cool, (Fluff & Gravy, 2019)

References

American singer-songwriters
Living people
1970 births
21st-century American singers